is a Japanese anime television series which aired weekdays on the Fuji TV Network in Japan between October 1, 1976, and March 31, 1982, for a total of 1428 five-minute episodes. It was sponsored by the National Federation of Agricultural Co-operative Associations (now more commonly as  JA Zen-Noh).

Plot
The series doesn't have a real plot, but is rather an educational series using both live action and animation to provide information about life in modern Japan. The series content has been compared to that of Bottle Fairy. The series was sponsored by the National Federation of Agricultural Co-operative Associations, as well as by the office of the Prime Minister of Japan.

Characters

The grandmother. 

The father of the family. 

The wife of Yutaka. 

Son of Yutaka and Sachiko. 

Daughter of Yutaka and Sachiko.

References

External links

1976 anime television series debuts
1982 Japanese television series endings
Eiken (studio)
Fuji TV original programming